Domenico Maceri is an Italian-American educator and journalist. He retired after teaching for thirty-five years at Allan Hancock College but continues his work as a journalist, writing a weekly column in Italian for America Oggi.

Early life and education
Maceri was born in Pellegrina, Bagnara, Reggio Calabria, Italy, and moved to the US with his family as a teenager. After completing high school, he went on to obtain a BA in French and Spanish at New Jersey City University. Subsequent studies led to an MA in Italian literature at UCLA where he also served as a teaching assistant. In 1990, he completed a PhD in Comparative Literature (Italian, French, Spanish) at the University of California at Santa Barbara.

Academic career

As a faculty member at Allan Hancock College, Maceri taught Spanish, French, and Italian. He published a book on Pirandello, one on Spanish grammar, and another on Italian grammar. He also published a number of academic articles in Italian Quarterly, Selecta, Hispania, Mosaic, Mester, Language Magazine, Italian Journal, Teacher Magazine, World Literature Today, and elsewhere.

Journalistic career

Maceri has published op-ed pieces in English in The Japan Times, The Washington Times, The Chicago Tribune, The New York Times 

and many other newspapers on a wide range of topics including multilingualism,

 immigration, and politics. Maceri has also published op-eds in Italian on similar topics in Il Nuovo Riformista, Le Opinioni delle Liberta, and in L'Unita, etc. He writes a weekly column for America Oggi. In 2005, one of his editorials won an award from the National Association of Hispanic Publications.

References

New Jersey City University alumni
University of California, Los Angeles alumni
University of California, Santa Barbara alumni
Allan Hancock College faculty
Italian educators
American people of Italian descent
Italian journalists
Italian male journalists
Italian columnists
1952 births
Living people
People from Bagnara Calabra